The 1904 North Carolina A&M Aggies football team represented the North Carolina A&M Aggies of North Carolina College of Agriculture and Mechanic Arts during the 1904 college football season. This was first and only season as head coach of the Aggies.

Schedule

References

North Carolina AandM
NC State Wolfpack football seasons
North Carolina AandM Aggies football